Joe Palooka, Champ is a 1946 American film featuring the comic-strip boxer Joe Palooka.  This film from Monogram Pictures is the beginning of a series with eleven sequels:

 Gentleman Joe Palooka (1946) 
 Joe Palooka in the Knockout (1947) 
 Joe Palooka in Fighting Mad (1948) 
 Joe Palooka in Winner Take All (1948) 
 Joe Palooka in the Big Fight (1949) 
 Joe Palooka in the Counterpunch (1949) 
 Joe Palooka Meets Humphrey (1950) 
 Joe Palooka in Humphrey Takes a Chance (1950) 
 Joe Palooka in the Squared Circle (1950) 
 Joe Palooka in Triple Cross (1951)

Cast 
 Leon Errol as Knobby Walsh  
 Joe Kirkwood, Jr. as Joe Palooka  
 Elyse Knox as Anne Howe  
 Eduardo Ciannelli as Florini  
 Joe Sawyer as Lefty  
 Elisha Cook, Jr. as Eugene  
 Warren Hymer as Ira Eyler  
 Robert Kent as Ronnie Brewster  
 Sam McDaniel as Smoky  
 Sarah Padden as Mom Palooka 
 Joe Louis as Joe Louis
 Manuel Ortiz as Manuel Ortiz
 Michael Mark as Pop Palooka  
 Dave Willock as Mr. Rodney   
 Lou Nova as Al Costa  
 Eddie Gribbon as Louie the Louisiana Lion  
 J. Farrell MacDonald as Long-Count Bowman
 Philip Van Zandt as Freddie Wells 
 Betty Blythe as Mrs. Stafford
 Carol Hughes as Mrs. Van Pragg
 Dewey Robinson as Police Captain

External links 
 
 Turner Classic Movies page

1946 films
1940s sports films
American black-and-white films
American boxing films
Films directed by Reginald Le Borg
Monogram Pictures films
Films based on American comics
1940s American films
Joe Palooka films